Kachaleh (also Romanized as Kachaleh; also known as Kachalābād) is a village in Margavar Rural District, Silvaneh District, Urmia County, West Azerbaijan Province, Iran. At the 2006 census, its population consisted of 483 people, in 100 families.

References 

Populated places in Urmia County